Moroni Bing Torgan (born October 6, 1956) is a Brazilian politician, probably the highest ranking Latter-day Saint politician in Brazil. A member of the National Chamber of Deputies, Torgan is known for having a rhetoric that spins around the fighting of crime and corruption. As of 2001 he was the only Latter-day Saint serving in Brazil's congress.

Biography 
Prior to his election to the National Congress, Torgan served as president of the Fortaleza Brazil Stake from 1985 to 1991.

As a youth, Torgan was on a Brazilian national championship volleyball team. He is from Porto Alegre, RS, Brazil. His great-grandmother on his mother's side was among the first members of the LDS branches in Brazil in 1938. Torgan grew up primarily in the Brazilian state of Rio Grande do Sul and graduated from the Federal University of Rio Grande do Sul.

Torgan served a mission for the Church of Jesus Christ of Latter-day Saints (LDS Church) in a mission based in Sao Paulo. His mission president was Saul Messias.

Prior to entering politics, Torgan was a Brazilian federal police officer in Ceara State. In 1987, he was appointed secretary of public security for this state, in which he served until he was elected to Brazil's congress in 1991.

Torgan is married to the former Rosa Caldas. As of 1989 they had two sons, Mosiah and Jared.

Torgan served in the congress of Brazil from 1991 to 1995. In 1995, he was elected vice governor of Ceara. He later served in the Brazilian congress again from 1999 to 2003 and from 2003 to 2007.

In 2009, Torgan was called to serve as president of the Portugal Lisbon Mission of the LDS Church. On March 31, 2012, Torgan was called as an area seventy of the church. At times, Torgan has served in other positions in the LDS Church, including as a bishop and as a counselor to the president of the Brazilia Brazil Mission.

In October 2012, Torgan placed fourth in the election for Mayor of Fortaleza, CE, Brazil.

Notes

References
 Church News, August 25, 2001; September 16, 1995; March 16, 1991; September 23, 1989.
 "Appointments", Ensign, February 1986, p. 77
Mormon Times, October 1, 2009
 government bio of Torgan

1956 births
Brazilian leaders of the Church of Jesus Christ of Latter-day Saints
Mormon missionaries in Brazil
Living people
People from Fortaleza
Brazilian Mormon missionaries
20th-century Mormon missionaries
Brazilian police officers
21st-century Mormon missionaries
Mormon missionaries in Portugal
Area seventies (LDS Church)
Mission presidents (LDS Church)
Members of the Chamber of Deputies (Brazil) from Ceará
Brazilian men's volleyball players